Natali Dizdar (born 24 August 1984), also known as Natalie Dizdar, is a Croatian pop singer.

Life and career

Early life
Dizdar was born in Zadar and raised in Sukošan, and attended music school in her youth.

Career
She became famous by becoming the runner-up of the Story Supernova Music Talents reality show, aired on Nova TV in late 2003. Endowed with an indisputable vocal talent, after the show she pursued a solo career, signed a contract with Croatia Records, trying to build a repertoire based on pop-jazz and other more worldly elements of popular music. Her first single, Ne daj, was entered into the 2004 Split Festival and soon became a radio hit. She collaborated with Matija Dedić, Arsen Dedić and Coco Mosquito on her first few albums.

Personal life
In 2011 Dizdar graduated from the Faculty of Education and Rehabilitation Sciences, University of Zagreb.

Discography

Studio albums

Live albums

Singles

References

External links
 

1984 births
Living people
21st-century Croatian women singers
Croatian pop singers
Musicians from Zadar
University of Zagreb alumni